Mortal Causes is a 1994 novel by Ian Rankin. It is the sixth of the Inspector Rebus novels.  It was the fourth episode in the Rebus television series starring John Hannah, airing in 2004.

Plot summary

Set during the Edinburgh Festival, this novel starts with a brutally executed corpse being discovered in Mary King's Close, an ancient subterranean street. The body has a tattoo identified with "Sword and Shield", a long-thought-defunct Scottish Nationalist group with links to sectarianism in Northern Ireland. The victim turns out to be the son of notorious gangster 'Big Ger' Cafferty, and the plot moves towards the unthinkable prospect of a terrorist atrocity in a tourist-filled Edinburgh.

Connections to other Rankin books

 Scottish Sword and Shield was first mentioned in passing in The Black Book.
 Recurring character "the Weasel" makes his debut.

Writing Mortal Causes

Rankin has stated that one of the minor characters is based on the Northern Irish loyalist paramilitary Billy Wright.

Political background

The political background of the plot depicts an alliance between Scottish nationalist fringe groups and loyalist paramilitaries who believe they're being 'sold out' in the peace deal with the IRA.  While there is significant support for loyalist paramilitarism in Scotland, radical Scottish nationalist fringe groups are far more likely to support the Irish Republican cause and to see the Republic of Ireland as a partial role model for an independent Scotland.

However, the background also makes a point of showing how the Northern Irish paramilitaries have turned to regular organised crime and are willing to cut deals with each other with money, and much of the scheming is based around criminal deals - the attempted terrorist in the book has no political aims.

The joke

Throughout the book, Rebus keeps overhearing parts of a joke about a squid with a moustache that goes into a restaurant. According to Ian Rankin, the punch line is as follows: 'For Hans that does dishes can feel as soft as Gervase with mild, green, hairy-lipped squid'.

The punch line is a reference to the long-running advertising slogan of Fairy Liquid. ("Now hands that do dishes can feel soft as your face, with mild green Fairy Liquid.")

1994 British novels
Inspector Rebus novels
Novels set in Edinburgh
Edinburgh Festival
Orion Books books